Birmingham East was a parliamentary constituency in the city of Birmingham, England.  It returned one Member of Parliament (MP) to the House of Commons of the Parliament of the United Kingdom, elected by the first-past-the-post voting system.

The constituency was created upon the abolition of the Birmingham constituency in 1885, and was itself abolished for the 1918 general election.

Boundaries
Before 1885 Birmingham, in the county of Warwickshire, had been a three-member constituency (see Birmingham (UK Parliament constituency) for further details). Under the Redistribution of Seats Act 1885 the parliamentary borough of Birmingham was split into seven single-member divisions, one of which was Birmingham East. It consisted of the wards of Duddeston and Nechells, the local government district of Saltley, and the hamlet of Little Bromwich.

The division was bounded to the west by Birmingham North, to the north by Aston Manor, to the east by Tamworth and to the south (from west to east) by Birmingham Central, Birmingham South and Birmingham Bordesley.

In the 1918 redistribution of parliamentary seats, the Representation of the People Act 1918 provided for twelve new Birmingham divisions. The East division was abolished.

Members of Parliament

Elections

Elections in the 1880s

Matthews was appointed Home Secretary, requiring a by-election.

Elections in the 1890s

Elections in the 1900s

Elections in the 1910s

General Election 1914–15:

Another General Election was required to take place before the end of 1915. The political parties had been making preparations for an election to take place and by July 1914, the following candidates had been selected; 
Unionist: Arthur Steel-Maitland
Labour: George Shann

In popular culture

Birmingham East was used in BBC sitcom Yes, Minister, and Jim Hacker was its MP. Although Hacker's Party was left unspecified, he was shown to be elected in the fictional 1981 general election, defeating a Conservative and Labour challenger.

See also
List of former United Kingdom Parliament constituencies

Notes and References
Notes

References

 Boundaries of Parliamentary Constituencies 1885-1972, compiled and edited by F.W.S. Craig (Parliamentary Reference Publications 1972)
 British Parliamentary Election Results 1885-1918, compiled and edited by F.W.S. Craig (Macmillan Press 1974)
 Debrett’s Illustrated Heraldic and Biographical House of Commons and the Judicial Bench 1886
 Debrett’s House of Commons and the Judicial Bench 1901
 Debrett’s House of Commons and the Judicial Bench 1918

Parliamentary constituencies in Birmingham, West Midlands (historic)
Constituencies of the Parliament of the United Kingdom established in 1885
Constituencies of the Parliament of the United Kingdom disestablished in 1918